"SUPER DELICATE" is a single by Hey! Say! JUMP. It was released on February 22, 2012, and topped the Oricon Daily Single Chart selling 110,000 copies on its first day. The single was certified Platinum by the Recording Industry Association of Japan

Information 
"SUPER DELICATE" serves as the opening theme song for drama Risou no Musuko, a comedy drama which stars Hey! Say! JUMP members Ryosuke Yamada and Yuto Nakajima. The song lyrics were written by the scenario writer Shinji Nojima who also wrote the script for the drama as well.

The single was released on three versions: two limited edition and one regular.

Video

Background and previews 
On February 3, a short clip and a behind the scene footage of the single's PV was shown on the Japanese television, ZIP!. Another 26-second preview was shown on February 7, 2012.

A short version of the PV was released by J Storm last February 10, 2012 via We Believe in Music. The full PV was released on February 22, 2012.

Performance 
 Hey! Say! JUMP's performance of the song was shown on Shonen Club last 13 February 2012. 
 The group performed the single on 10 February 2012 episode of Music Station. 
 Performed Ichiban song show (一番ソングSHOW) on 22 February 2012. 
 Group performed in Music Station 25 February 2012.

Regular Edition 
CD
 "SUPER DELICATE"
 "JUMP Around The World!!!"
 "JUMP Around The World!!!" (Original Karaoke)
 "succeed" (Original Karaoke)

Limited Edition 1 
CD
 "SUPER DELICATE"
 "Su・Ri・Ru" - Hey! Say! BEST
 
DVD
 "SUPER DELICATE" (PV & Making of)

Limited Edition 2 
CD
 "SUPER DELICATE"
 "Wonderland Train" - Hey! Say! 7
 
DVD
 "Th • ri • ll" (Video Clip) - Hey! Say! BEST
 "Wonderland Train" (Video Clip) - Hey! Say! 7

Charts and certifications

Charts

Sales and certifications

Release history

References 

Hey! Say! JUMP songs
2012 singles
2012 songs
Oricon Weekly number-one singles
Billboard Japan Hot 100 number-one singles
J Storm singles